The 1994–95 Divizia D was the 53rd season of the Liga IV, the fourth tier of the Romanian football league system. The champions of each county association play against one from a neighboring county in a promotion play-off played over two legs. A special table was made and teams with the best 16 aggregate results were promoted to the third league.

Promotion play-off 

The matches was scheduled to be played on 4 and 11 June 1995.

|- 
||8–0||6–3 || 6–0 Pts.
||0–3||0–5 || 0–6 Pts.
||0–2||0–6 || 0–6 Pts.
||0–2||0–6 || 0–6 Pts.
||1–3||0–3 || 0–6 Pts.
||3–0||3–1 || 6–0 Pts.
||3–0||3–1 || 6–0 Pts.
||4–1||2–0 || 6–0 Pts.
||1–2||0–3 || 0–6 Pts.
||0–2||0–2 || 0–6 Pts.
||0–1||0–2 || 0–6 Pts.
||2–1||3–2 || 6–0 Pts. 
||0–1||0–1 || 0–6 Pts. 
||2–1||2–1 || 6–0 Pts. 
||1–1||1–10 || 1–4 Pts.
||1–1||0–1 || 1–4 Pts.
||1–1||0–1 || 1–4 Pts.
||2–1||0–6 || 3–3 Pts.
||1–0||1–5 || 3–3 Pts.
||4–0||0–1 || 3–3 Pts.
||2–1||2–5 || 3–3 Pts.
|}

County leagues

Arad County 

Relegation play-off  
First round 

|}
Second round

|}

Caraș-Severin County

Cluj County

Harghita County

Hunedoara County

Mureș County

Neamț County

Olt County

Vâlcea County

See also 
 1994–95 Divizia A
 1994–95 Divizia B

References

External links
 FRF

Liga IV seasons
4
Romania